Víctor Vázquez Rosales (born 17 October 1989), sometimes known as Churre, is a Spanish footballer who plays for Pontevedra CF as a centre-back.

Club career
Born in Marín, Pontevedra, Vázquez graduated from local RC Celta de Vigo's youth system, making his senior debut with the reserves in 2007–08, in Segunda División B. On 31 January 2009, after not featuring whatsoever in the first half of the season, he joined Galician neighbours Portonovo SD on loan.

Vázquez played his first game as a professional on 6 January 2010, starting for Celta in a 1–1 home draw against Villarreal CF in that campaign's Copa del Rey. His league debut came on 19 June, in a 0–1 loss to SD Huesca in the Segunda División also at Balaídos.

On 11 July 2013, Vázquez left Celta B and joined Racing de Ferrol, also in his native region and the third tier. He scored his first goal for the club on 10 November against his former team, which was also the 5,000th in Racing's history.

Vázquez continued to play in division three (but also lower) until his retirement, having signed for Pontevedra CF in July 2018.

References

External links

Celta de Vigo biography 

1989 births
Living people
Spanish footballers
Footballers from Marín, Pontevedra
Association football defenders
Segunda División players
Segunda División B players
Tercera División players
Primera Federación players
Segunda Federación players
Celta de Vigo B players
Portonovo SD players
RC Celta de Vigo players
Racing de Ferrol footballers
Pontevedra CF footballers